This article documents notable spaceflight events during the year 2022. For the second year in a row, new records were set for the most orbital launch attempts and the most successful orbital launches in a year.

Overview

Exploration of the Solar System 
NASA continued the mission of the Juno spacecraft at Jupiter by conducting a flyby of Europa on 29 September 2022.

In Mars exploration, the European Space Agency (ESA) had partnered with Roscosmos to launch the Rosalind Franklin rover using the Kazachok lander as part of ExoMars 2022. In March 2022, the launch was cancelled in the wake of the Russian invasion of Ukraine and the subsequent suspension of ESA–Roscosmos cooperation on ExoMars.

On 3 October 2022, the Indian Space Research Organisation released a statement that all attempts to revive their Mars Orbiter Mission (MOM), also called Mangalyaan, had failed and officially declared it dead citing the loss of fuel and battery power to the probe's instruments.

On 20 December 2022, NASA announced that the InSight lander had lost communications with Earth on 15 December 2022, with the end of the mission being declared on 21 December 2022.

Lunar exploration 

NASA's CAPSTONE lunar orbiter launched on June 28 and arrived in lunar orbit on 14 November 2022.

Artemis 1, the first flight of NASA's Space Launch System (SLS) and the first lunar mission for Orion, was launched on November 16, 2022. Artemis 1 transported as secondary payloads many small lunar research spacecraft. Japan launched the OMOTENASHI lunar lander as a secondary payload of the Artemis 1 mission; contact with OMOTENASHI was lost and the mission failed before the landing sequence to the lunar surface had begun.

The United States planned to also launch a number of commercial lunar landers and rovers. As part of NASA's Commercial Lunar Payload Services program, the launch of Astrobotic Technology's Peregrine lander and Intuitive Machines' Nova-C lander was scheduled. However, all the launches of US commercial lunar landers and rovers planned for 2022 were delayed to 2023.

On 4 August 2022, South Korea's first lunar orbiter Danuri was launched into space by a Falcon 9 rocket. The orbiter took several months to enter lunar orbit; lunar orbit insertion happened on 16 December 2022 (UTC).

On 11 December 2022 a Falcon 9 rocket launched the Hakuto-R Mission 1, a private Moon mission by the Japanese company ispace. Onboard the Hakuto-R lunar lander were the Lunar Excursion Vehicle 1 (LEV-1, also called Transformable Lunar Robot) lunar rover from Japan and the Rashid lunar rover flying the Emirates Lunar Mission. Landing to Moon was planned to occur in April 2023. The NASA lunar orbiter, Lunar Flashlight, was launched as piggyback payload.

Human spaceflight 
China finished the construction of the Tiangong space station with the addition of the Wentian and Mengtian lab modules. Wentian was successfully launched and docked to the space station on 24 July 2022, while Mengtian was launched on 31 October 2022 and was docked to the space station later that day. On 29 November 2022 with Shenzhou 15 docking to the Tiangong space station, China started its first crew handover.

On 19 May 2022, Boeing launched the almost six-day (landing 25 May 2022) second uncrewed test flight of its Starliner space capsule. The test flight was successful and led the way for Starliner's first crewed test flight in 2023.

Space tourism
Blue Origin's New Shepard launched six passengers each on a suborbital trajectory in three flights, NS-20 on 31 March, NS-21 on 4 June and NS-22 on 4 August. The failure of the uncrewed flight NS-23 in September paused launches of the system.

On 8 April 2022, SpaceX's Crew Dragon space capsule was launched by a Falcon 9 rocket for the first American space tourist mission to the  International Space Station. The crew on board the Axiom Space-operated mission included one professional astronaut (space vehicle commander) and three tourists. The mission, known as Axiom Mission 1, lasted a little over 17 days and was the first wholly commercially operated crewed mission to the ISS.

Rocket innovation 
Arianespace's Ariane 6 was expected to make its long-delayed maiden flight, targeting a per-satellite launch cost similar to a Falcon 9, but was delayed to 2023.

After suborbital tests in 2020 and 2021, SpaceX planned to conduct the first orbital test flight of the fully reusable Starship launch vehicle. This did not happen.

The maiden flight of Vulcan Centaur was planned for 2022. The launch vehicle is designed by United Launch Alliance to gradually replace Atlas V and Delta IV Heavy at lower costs. However, the maiden flight was delayed to 2023.

Mitsubishi Heavy Industries's H3 launch vehicle, which was scheduled to enter service in 2022, targeted a cost less than half that of its predecessor H-IIA. The maiden flight of H3 did not take place in 2022.

On 21 January 2022, the Atlas V 511 launched for the first time. This was the only planned flight of the Atlas V in the 511 configuration. The launch was successful.

On 29 March 2022, the Long March 6A rocket performed its maiden launch, successfully reaching orbit.

On 29 April 2022, the Angara 1.2 rocket had its maiden launch, successfully reaching orbit.

On 2 May 2022, Rocket Lab attempted first mid-air helicopter capture of the first stage of their Electron rocket. Attempt was successful at initially grabbing the rocket, but the vehicle was dropped in order to ensure the safety of the helicopter and its pilot.

On 13 July 2022, Vega-C had its debut flight during which it delivered the LARES 2 and six other satellites from French Guiana to orbit.

On 27 July 2022, CAS Space's ZK-1A rocket performed its maiden launch, successfully sending six satellites into orbit.

On 7 August 2022, SSLV had its debut flight. However, due to the final VTM stage failure, the stage as well as the two satellite payloads were injected into an unstable elliptical orbit measuring 356 km x 76 km and subsequently destroyed upon reentry. According to the ISRO, the mission software failed to identify and correct a sensor fault in the VTM stage.

On 16 November 2022, Artemis 1 saw the debut flight of NASA's Space Launch System, which is designed to return humans to the Moon in the Artemis program.

On 9 December 2022, Jielong-3 performed its maiden launch from the Yellow Sea, successfully sending fourteen satellites into orbit.

On 14 December 2022, Zhuque-2 had its debut flight, but failed to reach orbit due to the early shutdown of the second stage engine. It was the world's first orbital launch attempt of a methane-fueled launch vehicle.

Space debris and satellites management 
According to a space monitoring company, in January a Chinese satellite, SJ-21, grabbed an unused satellite and "threw" it into an orbit with a lower risk for the space debris to collide. In March, the IAU announced the Centre for the Protection of the Dark and Quiet Sky from Satellite Constellation Interference to coordinate or aggregate measures to mitigate the detrimental effects of satellite constellations on astronomy. On March 4, for the first time, human space debris – most likely a spent rocket body, Long March 3C third stage from the 2014 Chang'e 5 T1 mission – unintentionally hit the lunar surface, creating an unexpected double crater.

Consequences of the 2022 Russian invasion of Ukraine 

Following the Russian invasion of Ukraine on 24 February 2022, a large number of countries imposed further international sanctions against individuals, businesses and officials from Russia, Crimea and Belarus. Russia responded with sanctions against a number of countries.
This led to tensions between the Russian space agency and its partners.

 The Soyuz at the Guiana Space Centre program has been suspended.
 Several Soyuz launches from the Baikonur Cosmodrome have been cancelled. Combined, six launches planned for OneWeb have been cancelled. The Russian space agency removed the flags of the United States and Japan from a Soyuz rocket.
 On March 8, former NASA astronaut Scott Kelly declared he would give back his Russian spaceflight medal.
 The ESA/Roscosmos joint ExoMars 2022 mission to launch the Rosalind Franklin rover using the Kazachok lander to Mars was suspended and the launch cancelled in March 2022.
 The German component (eROSITA) of the joint German/Russian space telescope mission Spektr-RG was suspended on 26 February 2022.
 Russia announced it would stop delivering rocket engines to US and stop support (maintenance etc.) of engines already in the US.

Orbital and suborbital launches

Deep-space rendezvous

Extravehicular activities (EVAs)

Space debris events

Orbital launch statistics

By country 
For the purposes of this section, the yearly tally of orbital launches by country assigns each flight to the country of origin of the launch vehicle, not to the launch services provider or the spaceport. For example, Soyuz launches by Arianespace in Kourou are counted under Russia because Soyuz-2 is a Russian launch vehicle.

By rocket

By family

By type

By configuration

By spaceport

By orbit

Suborbital launch statistics

By country 
For the purposes of this section, the yearly tally of suborbital launches by country assigns each flight to the country of origin of the rocket, not to the launch services provider or the spaceport. Flights intended to fly below  are omitted.

See also 

 List of commanders of the International Space Station

Notes

References

External links 

 
Spaceflight by year
2022-related lists